In mathematical physics, the primon gas or free Riemann gas is a toy model illustrating in a simple way some correspondences between number theory and ideas in quantum field theory and dynamical systems. It is a quantum field theory of a set of non-interacting particles, the primons; it is called a gas or a free model because the particles are non-interacting. The idea of the primon gas was independently discovered by Donald Spector and Bernard Julia. Later works by Bakas and Bowick and Spector  explored the connection of such systems to
string theory.

The model

State space 
Consider a Hilbert space H with an orthonormal basis of states  labelled by the prime numbers p. Second quantization gives a new Hilbert space K, the bosonic Fock space on H, where states describe collections of primes - which we can call primons if we think of them as analogous to particles in quantum field theory.   This Fock space has an orthonormal basis given by finite multisets of primes.  In other words, to specify one of these basis elements we can list the number   of primons for each prime :

where the total  is finite.  Since any positive natural number  has a unique factorization into primes:

we can also denote the basis elements of the Fock space as simply  where 

In short, the Fock space for primons has an orthonormal basis given by the positive natural numbers, but we think of each such number  as a collection of primons: its prime factors, counted with multiplicity.

Energies 
If we take a simple quantum Hamiltonian H to have eigenvalues proportional to log p, that is,

with

we are naturally led to

Statistical mechanics 
The partition function Z is given by the Riemann zeta function:

with s = E0/kBT where kB is the Boltzmann constant and T is the absolute temperature. 

The divergence of the zeta function at s = 1 corresponds to the divergence of the partition function at a Hagedorn temperature of TH = E0/kB.

The supersymmetric model
The above second-quantized model takes the particles to be bosons. If the particles are taken to be fermions, then the Pauli exclusion principle prohibits multi-particle states which include squares of primes. By the spin–statistics theorem, field states with an even number of particles are bosons, while those with an odd number of particles are fermions. The fermion operator (−1)F has a very concrete realization in this model as the Möbius function , in that the Möbius function is positive for bosons, negative for fermions, and zero on exclusion-principle-prohibited states.

More complex models
The connections between number theory and quantum field theory can be somewhat further extended into connections between topological field theory and K-theory, where, corresponding to the example above, the spectrum of a ring takes the role of the spectrum of energy eigenvalues, the prime ideals take the role of the prime numbers, the group representations take the role of integers, group characters taking the place the Dirichlet characters, and so on.

References

External links
 John Baez, This Week's Finds in Mathematical Physics, Week 199

Number theory
Quantum field theory
statistical mechanics